Strefling is an uncommon surname that originates in Ramsey, Cambridgeshire, England. It is a variant of Stribling from the Old English Stryplynge which means "a youth". Perhaps the name was given to a person with a youthful appearance. The most recent adaptation of the Strefling surname occurred in Ukraine in the late 1800s and was solidified when the Ukrainian-German Strefling family immigrated to North America.

The first recorded Strefling predecessor was dated 1259, that of Symon Stripling, in the Court Rolls of the Abbey of Ramsey, Ramsey, Cambridgeshire during the reign of King Henry III of England. It was during this period of time that surnames were first used.

Other variants of Strefling include: Stribley, Strybley, Streplink, Stripling, Stripp, Strapp, Strepling, Straefling, Striffling, Strifling, Strebling, Striebling, Strelping, Stroepling, Stribbling, Stribling, Striefler, and Strupe. Throughout the centuries, surnames in every country have continued to develop often leading to significant variants of the original spelling. The surname Strefling remains similar-sounding to the original Stryplynge, more so than the other variants. The surname Striebling which was German-sounding, appears to have been, likely unintentionally, returned to its Anglican root in recent history. The Strefling surname variants are primarily found in the United States, Canada, Brazil, England, France, Belgium, Germany, and Ukraine.

The most commonly used variant of the Strefling surname is Stripling, most of which have the surname Stripling are located in England, or have strong recent English heritage.

Persons with the Strefling, Strifling, and Striffling surnames in North America are likely decedents of August Striebling, born October 26, 1836, in Berwald, Volhynia. The Strefling name and many of its variants are found in the birth, marriage, and death records maintained by the Saint Petersburg Lutheran Consistory in Saint Petersburg, Russia. In these records it is clear to see the progression of Striebling to Strefling.

The Streflings immigrated to North America from Volhynia, Ukraine, in the late 1800s and early 1900s and primarily settled in Weesaw Township, Michigan; Kenosha, Wisconsin; and Rosthern, Saskatchewan. Many of the Streflings were instrumental in the founding of Lutheran Synods in America.

The Streflings immigrated to Volhynia (Volyn Oblast) during the reign of Catherine the Great. Russia’s Tsarina, Catherine the Great, was herself a German, and she invited the German people to join her in Russia. Seeking religious freedom and the promise of fertile land and prosperity, the Strefling family immigrated to Russia in the late 1700s and early 1800s. The Streflings were Protestant Lutherans during a time period where there was a post-reformation resurgence of Catholicism resulting in religious conflicts in Germany. It was also the promise of religious freedom and the opportunity for prosperity that brought them to North America in the late 1800s and early 1900s during a time of secularization and political instability in Russia and Europe.

Volhynia was once a part of Russia, Belarus, Poland, and is now in Ukraine. When the Strefling family immigrated to North America it was considered part of Belarus which translates to "White Russia" in English. It is not entirely known why the country was referred to as "White" but, the connotation has nothing to do with skin color.

Prior to living in Volhynia, the Strefling family likely had the surname Striefler and lived in the Saarland Bundesländer (Province) of Germany on the border with France. During this time (1700s) The Strieflers likely had close cousins in nearby England, France, and Belgium.

Notable Streflings include author Patricia Strefling, interventional cardiologist Dr. Jason Andrew Strefling, orthopaedic surgeon Marlen S Strefling, and businessman Mark M. Strefling.

References

Surnames of English origin
English-language surnames